Envy is a trademarked brand of the Scilate apple variety. Scilate is the result of a cross between Royal Gala and Braeburn. It was developed in New Zealand by HortResearch, submitted for a patent in 2008 and patented in 2009.

The Envy apple is mostly red with yellow specks.  The peel is fairly thick and tough.  The flesh is pale yellow.  It is a sweet apple with low acid and a slightly flowery taste. 

Distribution of the Envy apple in North America began in 2009 through the Oppenheimer Group, and ENZA (The New Zealand Apple and Pear Marketing Board); they began small commercial volumes in 2012 in Washington state. The first fruit surpassed 100,000 cartons for production in 2014. The companies anticipate harvesting 2 million cartons of the fruit by 2020.

Envy apples are being grown under license in New Zealand, Australia, Washington (U.S. state) and Chile. Field tests are also being done in the UK, France, and with organic cultivation in Italy.

References

External links
Official website

New Zealand apples
Apple cultivars